Bernhard VII of Anhalt-Zerbst (17 March 1540 – 1 March 1570), was a German prince of the House of Ascania and ruler of the principality of Anhalt-Zerbst.

He was born and died in Dessau, and was the third and youngest son of John V, Prince of Anhalt-Zerbst by his wife Margaret, daughter of Joachim I Nestor, Elector of Brandenburg.

Life
Bernhard inherited Anhalt-Zerbst when his father died in 1551 along with his older brothers Karl I and Joachim Ernest according to the stipulations of the family law of the House of Ascania, which mandated no division of the territories of the principality.

Upon the deaths without issue of his uncles George III of Anhalt-Plötzkau in 1553 and Joachim I of Anhalt-Dessau in 1561, Bernhard and Joachim Ernest inherited their lands, which were merged into Anhalt-Zerbst (Karl only inherited Plötzkau, because he died before Joachim I). In 1562 Anhalt-Köthen was also merged into Anhalt-Zerbst after the death without issue of its last prince, Wolfgang. Bernhard made his residence in Dessau.

Marriage and issue
In Dessau on 28 May 1565 Bernhard married Clara (b. Gifhorn, 1 January 1550 – d. Franzburg, 26 January 1598), posthumous daughter of Francis, Duke of Gifhorn. They had only one son:
Franz George (b. 17 October 1567 – d. Zerbst, 7 September 1568).

Bernhard died without surviving male heirs and was succeeded by his brother Joachim Ernest, who became sole ruler of all the Anhalt territories.

|-
| width="30%" align="center" rowspan="1"| Preceded byJohn V
| width="40%" align="center" | Prince of Anhalt-Zerbst with Karl I (until 1561) and Joachim Ernest 1551–1570
| width="30%" align="center" rowspan="4" | Succeeded byJoachim Ernest
|-
| width="30%" align="center" | Preceded byGeorge III
| width="40%" align="center" | Prince of Anhalt-Plötzkau with Karl I (until 1561) and Joachim Ernest 1553–1570
|-
| width="30%" align="center" | Preceded byJoachim I
| width="40%" align="center" | Prince of Anhalt-Dessau with Joachim Ernest 1561–1570
|-
| width="30%" align="center" | Preceded byWolfgang
| width="40%" align="center" | Prince of Anhalt-Köthen with Joachim Ernest 1562–1570
|-

Rulers of Anhalt
House of Ascania
1540 births
1570 deaths